The Inland Revenue Department (IRD) is the Hong Kong government department responsible for collecting taxes and duties.

History
The Inland Revenue Department was established on 1 April 1947. Initially it administered only one piece of legislation, the Inland Revenue Ordinance, which was enacted on 3 May 1947.

The department subsequently absorbed various elements of the Treasury, including the Estate Duty Office (in 1949), the Stamp Duty Office (1956), and responsibility for collection of entertainments, bets and sweeps, and public dance-halls taxes (1956).

In December 1979, the department's headquarters moved to Windsor House in Causeway Bay, a building that was specially designed with a second lift core for the department. In order to save on rental costs, the department moved again, in December 1991, to the eponymous government-owned Revenue Tower in Wanchai, where it remains headquartered as of 2020.

Ordinances administered
The IRD is responsible for the administration of the following Hong Kong ordinances on taxes and duties and the related rules and regulations:

 Betting Duty Ordinance Cap.108
 Business Registration Ordinance Cap.310
 Estate Duty Ordinance Cap.111
 Hotel Accommodation Tax Ordinance Cap.348
 Inland Revenue Ordinance Cap.112
 Stamp Duty Ordinance Cap.117
 Tax Reserve Certificates Ordinance Cap.289

Commissioners of Inland Revenue

References

External links 
 

1947 establishments in Hong Kong
Revenue services
Hong Kong government departments and agencies
Taxation in Hong Kong
Law of Hong Kong